Eufonius is a Japanese progressive pop rock music group which debuted on October 11, 2003 with the release of their first album Eufonius which was also an independent release. The band has produced songs for various anime and video games, such as Kashimashi: Girl Meets Girl, Himawari!, Noein, True Tears, Yosuga no Sora, Kokoro Connect, Shinkyoku Sōkai Polyphonica and visual novels like Key's  Clannad and Favorite's Irotoridori no Sekai. The band is composed of two primary members, Riya—who provided vocals and the majority of the lyrics—and Hajime Kikuchi—who plays the keyboard and handles composition, arrangement, and sometimes the lyrics. The third member is Masashi Ōkubo, who is a supporting member of the group.

They have released 17 studio albums as of June 2016, and have provided their talents in compilation albums and original soundtracks as well. Eufonius has hosted an Internet radio show called Frequency-e since May 2005 with broadcasts being released in irregular intervals; as of December 2011, there have been 12 broadcasts. On September 8, 2012, it was announced that Hajime Kikuichi would leave the band "for now", after making some degrading comments at singer Halko Momoi. Kikuchi returned in 2013 with the composition of the song "Lovely Smile", used as a theme song of Hooksoft's visual novel Lovely Quest: Unlimited.

Members
Riya — lyrics and vocals
 — composition and arrangement on the keyboard, and sometimes the songwriter.
 — supporting member

Discography

Studio albums
Eufonius (2003)
Eufonius+ (2005)
 (2006)
Σ (2007)
Metafysik (2007)
 (2008)
 (2009)
 (2009)
 (2010)
Bezel (2011)
 (2011)
 (2011)
 (2012)
Frasco (2014)
 (2014)
 (2015)
 (2016)
Phols (2021)

Compilation album
Kalyteryz (2015)

Internet radio show
Eufonius hosts an Internet radio show called Frequency-e which had its first broadcast on May 30, 2005. The broadcasts are hosted by Riya and Hajime Kikuchi, and are available for download at Eufonius' official website. Eufonius had originally planned to put out a new broadcast once a month, but due to being busy, they only release two or three a year in irregular intervals. As of December 17, 2011, there have been 12 broadcasts. The show primarily consists of Eufonius' members conversing, responding to listener's messages, or giving updates or general information on releases by the band. The name of the show comes from the name of the band's official website.

References

External links
Official website 

Anime musical groups
Japanese progressive rock groups
Lantis (company) artists